Falsilunatia notorcadensis is a species of predatory sea snail, a marine gastropod mollusk in the family Naticidae, the moon snails.

Distribution

Description 
The maximum recorded shell length is 29 mm.

Habitat 
Minimum recorded depth is 302 m. Maximum recorded depth is 604 m.

References

External links

Naticidae
Gastropods described in 1990